Yu Chenglei (born 8 March 1997) is a Chinese footballer currently playing as a defender for Shandong Taishan.

Career statistics

Club
.

References

1997 births
Living people
Chinese footballers
Association football defenders
China League Two players
Shandong Taishan F.C. players
Sichuan Jiuniu F.C. players